GS Tower, also called GS Gangnam Tower (formerly LG Kangnam Tower), is a 38-story (173 meters) modern skyscraper located in the Gangnam-gu area of Seoul, South Korea. It was completed in 1997 and is a mixed-use facility consisting of an art hall, performing arts theatre, corporate exhibition hall, offices, retail, restaurants, health club and parking.

Given the LG Arts Center's location within the building and urban neighborhood, close to the Seoul subway lines and major roads it was designed to provide a soundproof space.

Structural System
The building is engineered by SOM.  The lateral system consist of a combination of braced frames and perimeter moment frame.

References

1997 establishments in South Korea
GS Group
LG Corporation
Office buildings completed in 1997
Skyscraper office buildings in Seoul
Buildings and structures in Gangnam District
Skidmore, Owings & Merrill buildings